Michela Pavin (born 15 July 1994) is an Italian former professional racing cyclist. In 2015, Pavin finished fifth overall at the Tour of Zhoushan Island, and in 2017, she finished sixth at the Gran Premio della Liberazione and tenth at the Grand Prix de Dottignies.

See also
 2014 Alé Cipollini season

References

External links

1994 births
Living people
Italian female cyclists
Cyclists from the Province of Vicenza
People from Schio